Glee (stylized as glee) is  an American musical comedy-drama television series that aired on Fox network in the United States from May 19, 2009, to March 20, 2015. It centers on the New Directions, a glee club at the fictional William McKinley High School which competes as a show choir while its disparate members deal with social issues, especially regarding sexuality, race, family, teen relationships and teamwork.

The initial twelve-member cast included Matthew Morrison as club director and Spanish teacher Will Schuester, Jane Lynch as scheming cheerleading coach Sue Sylvester, Jayma Mays as the guidance counselor Emma Pillsbury, who has OCD, Jessalyn Gilsig as Will's wife Terri, and the eight original club members, including Dianna Agron as Quinn Fabray, a popular cheerleader whose biggest struggle is her teenage pregnancy; Chris Colfer as Kurt Hummel, a gay boy who feels conflicted by his sexuality and is bullied at school; Kevin McHale as Artie Abrams, who lives with a physical disability; Lea Michele as Rachel Berry, driven by her dreams of becoming a Broadway theatre star and the glee club's most obvious star singer; Cory Monteith as Finn Hudson, the school's star quarterback who sometimes appears not to be very smart; Amber Riley as Mercedes Jones, an African-American girl who endeavors to be recognized for her talents and dreams of being a vocal diva; Mark Salling as Noah Puckerman, a teenage delinquent in need of direction; and Jenna Ushkowitz as Tina Cohen-Chang, a shy girl of Korean descent who longs to be popular and sometimes experiences racism. The main cast was altered throughout the series, including the addition of Naya Rivera as Santana Lopez, an unapologetically Latina cheerleader experiencing deep conflict over her sexuality, Harry Shum Jr. as Mike Chang, a dancer with Chinese roots whose parents do not support his dreams, and Heather Morris as Brittany Pierce, a ditzy cheerleader who is secretly a math prodigy and comes to realize she is bisexual.

The series was created by Ryan Murphy, Brad Falchuk, and Ian Brennan, the latter of whom first conceived of Glee as a film. The three wrote all of the show's episodes for the first two seasons, and Murphy and Falchuk initially served as the show's main directors. The pilot episode was broadcast on May 19, 2009, and the first season aired from September 9, 2009, to June 8, 2010. Subsequent seasons aired from September through May. The sixth and final season aired from January to March 2015. Glee features on-screen performance-based musical numbers that were selected by Murphy, who aimed to maintain a balance between show tunes and chart hits, and produced by Adam Anders and Peer Åström. Songs covered in the show were released through the iTunes Store during the week of broadcast, and a series of Glee albums have been released by Columbia Records. The music of Glee has been a commercial success, with over 36 million digital single sales and eleven million album sales worldwide through October 2011. The series' merchandise also includes DVD and Blu-ray releases, an iPad application, and karaoke games for the Wii home videogame console. There were live concert tours by the show's cast after the first and second seasons completed shooting; a concert film based on the 2011 tour, Glee: The 3D Concert Movie, was produced by Murphy and Fox and directed by Kevin Tancharoen.

During its first season, Glee received generally favorable reviews from critics, with Metacritic's weighted average of 77 out of 100 based on 18 critical reviews. Glee has won many accolades. The season was nominated for 19 Emmy Awards, four Golden Globe Awards, six Satellite Awards and 57 other awards, with wins including the 2010 Golden Globe Award for Best Television Series – Musical or Comedy, and Emmy awards for Jane Lynch, guest-star Neil Patrick Harris and Murphy's direction of the pilot episode. In 2011, the show once again won the Golden Globe for Best Television Series, and Jane Lynch and Chris Colfer won Golden Globes for Best Supporting Actress and Best Supporting Actor respectively, and Gwyneth Paltrow won the Emmy for Outstanding Guest Actress in a Comedy Series. The show was also chosen by Fox to fill the coveted time slot that followed the network's coverage of Super Bowl XLV in 2011.

In 2013, in the wake of Cory Monteith's death and after his tribute episode "The Quarterback" aired, Murphy announced that the sixth season would be the series' last. After 121 episodes and over 729 music performances, the series concluded on March 20, 2015.

Series overview

The series centers on a high school show choir, also known as a glee club, in the fictional William McKinley High School in Lima, Ohio. Will Schuester (Matthew Morrison) takes over the glee club after the former teacher Sandy Ryerson (Stephen Tobolowsky) is fired for inappropriate contact with a student. With a rag-tag group of misfit teenagers, Will attempts to restore the glee club to its former glory while tending to his developing feelings for his co-worker, guidance counselor Emma Pillsbury (Jayma Mays), as well as defending the glee club's existence from the conniving cheerleading coach Sue Sylvester (Jane Lynch). A major focus of the series is the students in the glee club: their relationships as couples, their love of singing and desire for popularity coming into conflict due to their membership in the low-status club, and the many vicissitudes of life in high school and as a teenager.

The first season features the fictional high school show choir New Directions competing for the first time on the show choir circuit, winning at the Sectionals competition (episode 13) but losing at Regionals (season finale/episode 22), while its members and faculty deal with sex, relationships, homosexuality, teenage pregnancy, disabilities, acceptance and other social issues. The central characters are glee club director Will Schuester (Matthew Morrison), cheerleading coach Sue Sylvester (Jane Lynch), Will's wife Terri (Jessalyn Gilsig), guidance counselor Emma Pillsbury (Jayma Mays), and glee club members Rachel (Lea Michele), Finn (Cory Monteith), Artie (Kevin McHale), Kurt (Chris Colfer), Mercedes (Amber Riley), Tina (Jenna Ushkowitz), Puck (Mark Salling), and Quinn (Dianna Agron).

The second season follows the club through wins at the Sectionals (episode 9) and Regionals (episode 16) competitions before losing at the Nationals competition in New York City (season finale/episode 22), while its members and faculty deal with relationships, religion, homophobia, bullying, rumors, teenage drinking, death and other social issues. The season's stories revolve around the same Glee club members as first season, with Santana Lopez (Naya Rivera) and Brittany S. Pierce (Heather Morris) added to the main cast, along with Kurt's father Burt (Mike O'Malley).

The third season follows the club through wins at Sectionals (episode 8) and Regionals competitions (episode 14), before they win the Nationals competition (episode 21) in Chicago. The characters deal with gender identity, adoption, domestic abuse, teenage suicide, bullying, disabilities, texting while driving, college and other social issues. Glee club members added to the main cast were Mike Chang (Harry Shum Jr.) and transfer student Blaine Anderson (Darren Criss), while Jessalyn Gilsig as Terri Schuester was written out of the series and Mike O'Malley as Burt returned to recurring status. The McKinley High class of 2012 graduates at the end of the season.

The fourth season continues in Lima with a new generation of students but also follows some of the McKinley graduates from the third season, notably to the fictional New York Academy of the Dramatic Arts (NYADA) in New York City. The season follows the club through a loss at the Sectionals competition (episode 9) and subsequent reinstatement when the winning Dalton Academy Warblers were found to have used banned substances (human growth hormone) (episode 12) before winning at the Regionals competition (episode 22), which meant they would be attending their third consecutive National show choir competition. In the meantime, Rachel Berry and Kurt Hummel navigate NYADA and their lives as aspiring performers, plus their relationships with Finn and Blaine. Issues during the season include sex, bulimia, gender identity, child molestation, dyslexia, school violence, and pregnancy scares. Former main cast members Emma Pillsbury (Jayma Mays) and Quinn Fabray (Dianna Agron) were credited as guest stars, while previously recurring glee club member Sam Evans (Chord Overstreet) was promoted to the main cast.

The fifth season, unlike previous seasons, continues the school year begun in the previous season. The season shows the reigning champion glee club finishing second at Nationals competition (episode 11) before the club is permanently disbanded by Sue Sylvester, now school principal, for budgetary reasons (episode 12), leaving the focus on graduation. The show then jumps several months forward in time and deals entirely with the alumni's lives in New York City for the remainder of the season, including Rachel's successful Broadway debut. Throughout this season, the club and its alumni deal with relationships; death and mourning; body image, gay bashing, intimacy, and other social issues. Several main cast members dropped to recurring guest stars as of this season: Amber Riley as Mercedes, Mark Salling as Puck, Harry Shum Jr. as Mike and Heather Morris as Brittany. New main cast members included glee club members introduced in the fourth season: Melissa Benoist as Marley Rose, Alex Newell as Unique Adams, Blake Jenner as Ryder Lynn, Jacob Artist as Jake Puckerman, and Becca Tobin as Kitty Wilde. Actor Cory Monteith died during summer before the fifth season was shot; his character, Finn Hudson, died off-screen in the season's third episode, "The Quarterback".

The sixth and final season focuses on Rachel Berry, who returns to McKinley after her television pilot fails. She decides to reconstitute the glee club with all-new McKinley students and with Kurt's help. Will Schuester is now coaching rival club Vocal Adrenaline, while Blaine is coaching the Dalton Academy Warblers. All of the new main cast members from the fifth season have returned to guest star status in this final season when they appear, as well as Naya Rivera as Santana and Jenna Ushkowitz as Tina; Amber Riley as Mercedes rejoins the main cast, and Dot-Marie Jones as Coach Beiste joins the main cast for the first time. The cast members deal with gay marriage, gender identity, transitioning and other social issues. The newly reconstituted club wins the Nationals competition, Sue is fired as principal and Will is hired to be the principal of a McKinley High repurposed as a magnet arts school, with Sam as the new director of New Directions. The finale jumps five years into the future: Rachel has married Jesse St. James (Jonathan Groff), wins a Tony Award, and is a surrogate mother for Kurt and Blaine (who are themselves Broadway stars). Artie has directed Tina in a film, Mercedes is a highly successful recording artist, and Sue has just been re-elected Vice President of the United States. The McKinley auditorium is renamed after Finn.

Cast and characters

In casting Glee, Murphy sought out actors who could identify with the rush of starring in theatrical roles. Instead of using traditional network casting calls, he spent three months on Broadway, where he found Matthew Morrison, who had previously starred on stage in Hairspray and The Light in the Piazza; Lea Michele, who starred in Spring Awakening; and Jenna Ushkowitz, who had been in the Broadway revival of The King and I.

During their auditions, actors without any theatrical experience needed to demonstrate that they could also sing and dance. Chris Colfer had no previous professional experience, but Murphy wrote in the character Kurt Hummel for him. Jayma Mays auditioned with the song "Touch-a, Touch-a, Touch-a, Touch Me" from The Rocky Horror Show, while Cory Monteith initially submitted a tape of himself acting only, and was requested to submit a second, musical tape, in which he sang "a cheesy, '80s music-video-style version" of REO Speedwagon's "Can't Fight This Feeling". Kevin McHale came from a boy-band background, having previously been part of the group Not Like Them. He explained that the diversity of the cast's backgrounds reflects the range of different musical styles within the show itself: "It's a mix of everything: classic rock, current stuff, R&B. Even the musical theatre stuff is switched up. You won't always recognize it." Jane Lynch was originally supposed to have a recurring role as Sue Sylvester, but was made a series regular when a Damon Wayans pilot she was working on for ABC fell through. The cast is contracted for a potential three Glee films, with their contract stating that "[The actor] hereby grants Fox three exclusive, irrevocable options to engage [the actor] in up to, respectively, three feature-length motion pictures." Murphy said in December 2010 that he wasn't interested in doing a Glee movie "as a story", and added, "I might do it as a live concert thing." Glee: The 3D Concert Movie, filmed during the 2011 Glee Live! In Concert! tour, was released on August 12, 2011.

Glee has featured as many as fifteen main roles with star billing, after starting with twelve. Morrison plays Will Schuester, McKinley High's Spanish teacher, who becomes glee-club director and hopes to restore it to its former glory. Lynch plays Sue Sylvester, head coach of the "Cheerios" cheerleading squad, and the Glee Club's nemesis. Mays appears as Emma Pillsbury, the school's mysophobic guidance counselor who has feelings for Will, and Jessalyn Gilsig plays Terri Schuester, Will's wife whom he eventually divorces after five years of marriage and the discovery that she has faked being pregnant instead of revealing she had suffered a false pregnancy. Michele plays Rachel Berry, talented star of the glee club whose ambition sometimes causes her to be insensitive toward others. Often bullied by the Cheerios and football players, she grows closer to them as the show progresses and begins an on-and-off relationship with Finn Hudson starting in season one; they become engaged in season three. Monteith played Finn, star quarterback of the school's football team who risks alienation by his friends after joining the glee club. Also in the club are Amber Riley as Mercedes Jones, a fashion-conscious diva who resents having to sing back-up but eventually finds her place in the choir; Colfer as Kurt Hummel, a fashionable gay man countertenor who is often bullied by the jocks in the school; McHale as Artie Abrams, a guitar player and paraplegic who longs to be seen for his personality rather than only his physical injuries; and Ushkowitz as Tina Cohen-Chang, a painfully shy Asian American student who fakes a speech impediment as a defense mechanism. Dianna Agron plays Quinn Fabray, Finn's cheerleader girlfriend, who later joins the glee club to keep an eye on him. Mark Salling plays Noah "Puck" Puckerman, a good friend of Finn's on the football team who at first disapproves of Finn joining the glee club, but later joins it himself. Naya Rivera and Heather Morris portray Cheerios and glee club vocalists Santana Lopez and Brittany Pierce respectively and were originally recurring actors, but were promoted to series regulars in the second season. Mike O'Malley, who plays Kurt's father Burt Hummel, also became a series regular on season two. Gilsig and O'Malley no longer appeared on the list of starring actors at the beginning of the third season, though O'Malley was a recurring guest star in at least six episodes during the season. Two actors were promoted to series regulars as of the third season: Harry Shum Jr. as football player and glee club member Mike Chang and Darren Criss as former Dalton Academy Warbler and new club member Blaine Anderson, both of whom started as recurring actors, Shum in the first season and Criss in the second. For the fourth season, Chord Overstreet, who started as a recurring actor in the second season, playing glee club member Sam Evans, was promoted to the main cast, while Agron and Mays were credited as recurring guest stars.

Many of the original characters graduated from McKinley High at the end of the third season. Murphy said, "We didn't want to have a show where they were in high school for eight years. We really wanted to be true to that experience." Adult characters played by Matthew Morrison and Jane Lynch would remain to provide continuity to the series, though according to Falchuk, some students—Rachel, Finn and Kurt in particular—would likely remain on the show after they graduate. In May 2012, Murphy said that just because a character on the show graduates high school does not mean that they are leaving, "A lot of people have been writing Dianna's off the show, Amber's off the show — they're not off the show. I think Amber was talking about that bittersweet feeling of, 'I'll never be in the choir room with that exact group of people.' At least that's what she told me ... When I read that [tweet,] I said, 'I think people will misconstrue that.' She's excited about where her character is going. They all are. I wanted to do the right thing by all of them." He then continued: "They're all coming back. Anyone who is a regular is coming back. Everyone said yes."

On June 28, 2013, the media reported that Morris, Riley, Salling, and Shum would be changing from starring status to guest starring roles for the fifth season, and on the following day that Jacob Artist, Melissa Benoist, Blake Jenner, Alex Newell, and Becca Tobin, who play Jake Puckerman, Marley Rose, Ryder Lynn, Wade "Unique" Adams, and Kitty Wilde, respectively, were all being promoted to the show's main cast.

On July 13, 2013, Cory Monteith was found dead in his room at the Fairmont Pacific Rim hotel in Vancouver, British Columbia, after failing to check out. Staff were sent to his room where it was then that his body was discovered. An autopsy completed on July 15 indicated that he died of alcohol and heroin overdose. On July 20, 2013, Ryan Murphy said in various media outlets that Cory would have a tribute in season five's third episode, which would deal with the death of Monteith's character, Finn.

On July 30, 2013, Mays confirmed that she would depart the show after the fifth season to work on other projects, but stated that she would be open to returning as a guest star in the future.

On July 7, 2014, it was confirmed that Rivera and Ushkowitz would be placed on a recurring status for the sixth and final season. On August 28, a website revealed that Amber Riley would once again become a regular along with Dot-Marie Jones while Jayma Mays would be on a recurring status.

Production

Conception
Ian Brennan conceived Glee based on his own experience as a member of the Prospect High School show choir in Mount Prospect, Illinois. He initially envisioned Glee as a film, rather than a television series, and wrote the first draft in August 2005 with the aid of Screenwriting for Dummies. He completed the script in 2005, but could not generate interest in the project for several years. Mike Novick, a television producer and a friend of Brennan's from Los Angeles, was a member of the same gym as Ryan Murphy, and gave him a copy of Brennan's script. Murphy had been in a show choir in college and felt he could relate to the script. Murphy and his Nip/Tuck colleague Brad Falchuk suggested that Glee be produced as a television show. The script was entirely rewritten, and was picked up by Fox within fifteen hours of being received. Murphy attributed that, in part, to the network's success with American Idol. "It made sense for the network with the biggest hit in TV, which is a musical, to do something in that vein," he said. Murphy and Falchuk became the show's executive producers and showrunners, Brennan became a co-executive producer and Novick a producer. Brennan, Falchuk and Murphy started by writing "all the episodes".

Glee is set at the fictional William McKinley High School in Lima, Ohio. Murphy chose a Midwest setting as he himself grew up in Indiana, and recalled childhood visits to Ohio to the Kings Island theme park. Although set in Lima, the show is filmed at Paramount Studios and Helen Bernstein High School in Hollywood.

Murphy has said that he has never seen a High School Musical film, to which Glee has been compared, and that his interest lay in creating a "postmodern musical", rather than "doing a show where people burst into song", drawing more heavily on the format of Chicago. Murphy intended the show to be a form of escapism. "There's so much on the air right now about people with guns, or sci-fi, or lawyers running around. This is a different genre, there's nothing like it on the air at the networks and cable. Everything's so dark in the world right now, that's why Idol worked. It's pure escapism," he said. Murphy intended to make a family show to appeal to adults as well as children, with adult characters starring equally alongside the teenage leads, and as of October 2009 he had already mapped out plans for the series covering three years of broadcast.

Writing
The three creators—Murphy, Falchuk, and Brennan—plan the stories together. For the first two seasons, they were the only writers, and after taking joint credit for the pilot episode and the episode that opened the fall 2009 season, they began rotating taking a single auctorial credit, based in large part on the person "who's taken the lead in story breaking or who wrote a draft". Brennan noted that the writing process is "fast and loose, with the emphasis on fast", and quotes Murphy as having said, in terms of their roles in episode creation, "I'm sort of the brain. Brad's sort of the heart. Ian's sort of the funny bone", which Brennan says "is true in a lot of ways". Some of the characters are written more by one writer than by the others. Brennan writes most of Sue's material, and Falchuk frequently writes the scenes between Kurt and Burt Hummel, though Murphy contributes a great deal to Kurt.

Starting with season three, a writing staff of six was hired: Ali Adler, Roberto Aguirre-Sacasa, Marti Noxon, Michael Hitchcock, Matt Hodgson and Ross Maxwell. The season's fourth episode, "Pot o' Gold", was written by Adler, the first not credited to the show's three creators.

Adler and Noxon did not return for the show's fourth season and instead House writers Russel Friend and Garrett Lerner, and Stacy Traub were hired.

Music and choreography

The series features numerous song covers sung onscreen by the characters. Ryan Murphy was responsible for selecting all of the songs used, and has said that he strove to maintain a balance between chart hits and show tunes: "I want there to be something for everybody in every episode. That's a tricky mix, but that's very important—the balancing of that." According to Murphy, the song choices are integral to script development, "Each episode has a theme at its core. After I write the script, I will choose songs that help to move the story along." In a 2010 interview with Allison Kugel, Chris Colfer noted that "there have been a couple of times when I have gone to Ryan Murphy (Glee creator) and told him a couple of things that have happened to me, and then he writes it into the show. Or he'll ask me what song I would want to sing, in this situation or in that situation. I don't think any of us directly try to give input on the character or on the storyline, but they definitely steal things from us." For the second season, a shift toward using more Top 40 songs was seen, in an effort to appeal more to the 18–49 demographic.

Murphy was surprised at the ease with which use of songs was approved by the record labels approached, and explained: "I think the key to it is they loved the tone of it. They loved that this show was about optimism and young kids, for the most part, reinterpreting their classics for a new audience." A minority of those approached refused to allow their music to be used, including Bryan Adams, Guns N' Roses and Coldplay; however, in June 2010, Coldplay reversed their decision, allowing Glee the rights to their catalog. Adams posted on his Twitter account that the producers of Glee had never requested permission from him and urged them to "pick up the phone". Composer and musician Billy Joel offered many of his songs for use on the show, and other artists have offered use of their songs for free. A series of Glee soundtrack albums have been released through Columbia Records. Songs featured on the show are available for digital download through iTunes up to two weeks before new episodes air, and through other digital outlets and mobile carriers a week later. Glee music producers Adam Anders and Peer Astrom have begun to add original music to the show, including two original songs, "Loser like Me" and "Get It Right", on the March 15, 2011 episode.

Glee is choreographed by Zach Woodlee and features four to eight production numbers per episode. Once Murphy selects a song, rights are cleared with its publishers by music supervisor P. J. Bloom, and music producers Adam Anders and Peer Astrom rearrange it for the Glee cast. Numbers are pre-recorded by the cast, while Woodlee constructs the accompanying dance moves, which are then taught to the cast and filmed. Studio recordings of tracks are then made. The process begins six to eight weeks before each episode is filmed, and can end as late as the day before filming begins. Each episode costs at least $3 million to produce, and can take up to ten days to film as a result of the elaborate choreography. In late 2010, Bloom reported the process has been even shorter; "as quick as a few weeks". For the second season, the creators were offered listens of upcoming songs in advance by publishers and record labels, with production occurring even before song rights are cleared.

Promotion

Prior to the second episode's premiere, Glee cast went on tour at several Hot Topic stores across the nation. The cast sang the U.S. national anthem at the third game of the 2009 World Series. Macy's invited them to perform at the 2009 Macy's Thanksgiving Day Parade, but host broadcaster NBC declined because Glee aired on a rival network. Murphy commented on the cast's exclusion: "I completely understand NBC's position, and look forward to seeing a Jay Leno float."

The show's success sent the cast on a concert tour, Glee Live! In Concert! after the first season's wrapup. They visited Phoenix, Chicago, Los Angeles, and New York. The cast also recorded a cover of Wham!'s "Last Christmas", which was released as a single in late 2009 but didn't appear in the show until "A Very Glee Christmas" on December 10, 2010. Morrison, Lynch, Michele, Monteith, and Colfer reprised their roles as Will, Sue, Rachel, Finn, and Kurt respectively for a cameo appearance in an episode of The Cleveland Show that aired January 16, 2011. Michele, Monteith, and Riley appeared as campers in the twenty-second season premiere of The Simpsons.

Lynch, Colfer, Monteith, and Riley appeared at the 2010 MTV VMAs on September 12, 2010. When Agron, Michele, and Monteith posed for a set of risqué photos for the November 2010 edition of GQ magazine, Parents Television Council (PTC) criticized the show; PTC president Tim Winter commented that Glee has many young fans, and that "by authorizing this kind of near-pornographic display, the creators of the program have established their intentions on the show's direction. And it isn't good for families."

The promotional posters for the first season have the show's stars using their right hands to make an "L" to fill in the L of the word Glee. The second season's promotional posters have the stars throwing slushies at the camera in pairs. The third season's promotional posters have the stars getting dodgeballs thrown at them by Sue Sylvester. While the cast concert tour, Glee Live! In Concert!, began on May 15, 2010, and presented concerts in four cities in the US that month, the second edition, with an almost-entirely new set list, toured for four weeks in the US and Canada from May 21 through June 18, 2011, and followed with twelve days in England and Ireland, from June 22 through July 3, 2011. The cast also performed on the seventh season of The X Factor on December 5, 2010.

Possible continuation
In 2020, celebrating the show's 11 year anniversary, Ryan Murphy made an Instagram post about his idea of re-doing the show's pilot with Lea Michele, Ben Platt, and Beanie Feldstein. Murphy eventually deleted the post.

In 2021, Fox President Michael Thorn revealed he was interested in reviving past Fox programs, most notably 24 and Glee.

In 2022, in an interview with Kevin McHale and Jenna Ushkowitz, Ryan Murphy revealed he was interested in re-examining the series as a brand through a reboot or a Broadway musical.

Broadcast
The first season of Glee consists of twenty-two episodes. The pilot episode was originally broadcast on May 19, 2009. The series returned on September 9, 2009, airing an additional twelve episodes on Wednesdays in the 9:00 pm timeslot until December 9, 2009, for a total of thirteen episodes. On September 21, 2009, nine more episodes were ordered for the first season by Fox, and the first of these episodes was broadcast on April 13, 2010. These episodes aired on Tuesday evenings at 9:00 pm. On January 11, 2010, it was announced that Fox had commissioned a second season of the show. The second season began production in June 2010. Season two began on September 21, 2010, airing in the 8:00 pm time slot on Tuesdays, and consists of twenty-two episodes. The show was chosen by Fox to fill the coveted timeslot that followed the network's coverage of Super Bowl XLV in 2011, and the network originally planned to move the show to the 9:00 pm time slot on Wednesdays following the post–Super Bowl broadcast. However, Fox later revised its schedule, leaving Glee on Tuesdays in order to concentrate on building up its weaker Wednesday and Thursday line-ups. A third season was ordered by Fox on May 23, 2010, before the end of the first season. The early renewal of the show allowed the production team to cut costs and to plan ahead when writing scripts. The third season broadcasts remained in the show's Tuesday 8:00 pm time slot, and began airing on September 20, 2011. The show's fourth season changed both date and time of broadcast: it moved to Thursdays in the 9:00 pm time slot, and aired after that evening's 8:00 pm music competition "results" shows—The X Factor in the fall and American Idol in midseason. The show was renewed for both a fifth and sixth season at the same time, on April 19, 2013. Reruns were also syndicated to local US stations from 2013 to 2015.

Glee has been syndicated for broadcast in many countries worldwide, including Australia, where cast members visited to promote the show prior to its September 2009 debut on Network Ten. Midway through season four, Glee was moved to Network Ten's digital channel Eleven due to poor ratings. It also airs in Canada on City and, previously, Global, New Zealand, Fiji, and Trinidad and Tobago. It is broadcast in South Africa, where Fox beams the episodes directly to the M-Net broadcast center in Johannesburg rather than delivering the tapes. Asian countries that broadcast Glee include Bangladesh, the Philippines, India, Malaysia, and Singapore.

All the episodes of the series were announced to be arriving on Disney+ in Latin America in February 2021. In the United States, the series was made available on Disney+ and Hulu starting on June 1, 2022, following its December 2021 departure from Netflix after over seven years, as well as a year on Prime Video.

UK trademark dispute
In the United Kingdom, E4 broadcast the first two seasons of Glee, showing episodes months after they were first aired in the US. Sky 1 broadcast the series starting with the third season, airing episodes two days after their US broadcast. However, the show has come under a trademark dispute in the UK with the Glee Club, a small chain of independent live stand-up comedy and live music venues. In February 2014, a High Court judge ruled that the show "diluted and tarnished" the reputation of the comedy club chain. In a later ruling in July 2014, the High Court ordered Fox to use a different title for the show in the UK, saying there was a "likelihood of confusion" between the two brands. In February 2016, Fox lost an appeal against the decision.

Merchandise

Three soundtrack albums were released to accompany Glee first season: Glee: The Music, Volume 1, Glee: The Music, Volume 2 and Glee: The Music, Volume 3 Showstoppers. Two extended plays (EP) accompanied the episodes "The Power of Madonna" and "Journey to Regionals": Glee: The Music, The Power of Madonna and Glee: The Music, Journey to Regionals respectively. Glee: The Music, The Complete Season One, a compilation album featuring all 100 studio recordings from the first season, was released exclusively to the iTunes Store. Five soundtrack albums were released to accompany Glee second season: Glee: The Music, The Christmas Album, featuring Christmas-themed songs, and Glee: The Music, Volume 4, were both released in November 2010; Glee: The Music, Volume 5, Glee: The Music Presents the Warblers, and Glee: The Music, Volume 6 were 2011 releases, in March, April, and May, respectively. An EP entitled Glee: The Music, The Rocky Horror Glee Show was released to accompany the Halloween episode, "The Rocky Horror Glee Show". Two EPs were released exclusively at the Target discount chain: Glee: The Music, Love Songs in the last week of 2010, and Glee: The Music, Dance Party in early September 2011.

Glee has been released on several DVD and Blu-ray box-sets. Glee – Pilot Episode: Director's Cut features the pilot episode and a preview of the second episode, "Showmance". Glee – Volume 1: Road to Sectionals contains the first thirteen episodes of season one, and Glee – Volume 2: Road to Regionals contains the final nine episodes of the first season. Glee – The Complete First Season was released on September 13, 2010. Three boxed sets were released for the second season: Glee Season 2: Volume 1 containing the first ten episodes on January 25, 2011, and both Glee Season 2: Volume 2 with the final twelve episode and Glee: The Complete Second Season with all twenty-two on September 13, 2011. All three were released on DVD; only the complete season is available on Blu-ray.

Little, Brown Books has published three Glee-related young adult novels, all of which were developed in collaboration with the show's producers and writers. All three have been written by Sophia Lowell; the first, Glee: The Beginning, was released in August 2010 and serves as a prequel to the events of the television series. Subsequent novels include Glee: Foreign Exchange, released in February 2011, and Glee: Summer Break, released in July 2011.

Twentieth Century Fox Consumer Products have plans for a line of Glee-related merchandise including games, electrical products, greeting cards, apparel and stationery. Macy's carry a line of Glee-related clothing, and Claire's stock accessories.

Halfbrick Studios published a Glee content version of the mobile game Band Stars by Six Foot Kid  in collaboration with Fox Digital Entertainment on March 27, 2014, currently available on iOS platforms, but with plans to release to Android. The game is available for free download with some Glee content available immediately including Kurt Hummel and Will Schuester. 12 characters from the Glee TV show are available for purchase and download in two separate packs. Pack 1 contains: Rachel Berry, Mercedes Jones, Noah (Puck) Puckerman, Jake Puckerman and Quinn Fabray. Pack 2 contains: Artie Abrams, Tina Cohen-Chang, Blaine Anderson, Santana Lopez, Brittany Pierce and Unique Adams.

Reception and legacy

Ratings
The pilot episode of Glee averaged 9.62 million viewers, and the following eleven episodes attained between 6.10 and 7.65 million. The mid-season finale was watched by 8.13 million viewers, with the show returning in April 2010 to a season high of 13.66 million viewers. The following six episodes attained between 11.49 and 12.98 million viewers, falling to 8.99 million for the penultimate episode "Funk". Viewing figures rose to 11.07 million viewers for the season finale, giving Glee the highest finale rating for a new show in the 2009–10 television season. Only the first twenty episodes of the first season were accounted for when calculating the season average due to the final two episodes airing outside the traditional sweeps period. On February 6, 2011, after the Super Bowl, Glee received its highest ever ratings, with over 26.8 million tuning in to see the special episode, with a peak of 39.5 million.

In 2011, Glee generated $2 million advertising revenue per half-hour. In 2012, the show was the fourth-highest revenue earning show of the year, with US$2.83 million ad revenue per half-hour, behind Two and a Half Men, The X Factor and American Idol.

Critical reception

Glee received a Metacritic score of 78 out of 100 in its first season, based on reviews by eighteen critics, indicating "generally favorable reviews". It was praised by several critics in year-end "best of" reviews in 2009. James Poniewozik of Time ranked it the eighth best television show of the year, commenting: "when Glee works—which is often—it is transcendent, tear-jerking and thrilling like nothing else on TV." Entertainment Weekly Ken Tucker ranked it ninth, calling it "Hands down the year's most novel show [and] also its least likely success", Lisa Respers France of CNN wrote that while ordinarily Glee premise would have been "a recipe for disaster", the show has "such quirky charm and bravado that it is impossible not to get swept up". Reviews for subsequent seasons on Metacritic, reflecting their initial episodes, were not quite as good—the second season's score was 76 out of 100 from eleven reviews, and the fourth season received a score of 73 out of 100 from six reviews. Even with these stellar reviews from a multitude of critics, Glee's later seasons lost millions of viewers.

Nancy Gibbs of Time magazine wrote that she had heard the series described as "anti-Christian" by a youth minister, and commented:

It is easy to see his point, if you look at the specifics. ... The students lie, they cheat, they steal, they lust, they lace the bake-sale cupcakes with pot in order to give the student body a severe case of the munchies. Nearly all the Ten Commandments get violated at one point or another, while the audience is invited to laugh at people's pain and folly and humiliation. ... It insults kids to suggest that simply watching Characters Behaving Badly onscreen means they'll take that as permission to do the same themselves. ... And it's set in high school, meaning it's about a journey not just to college and career but to identity and conviction, the price of popularity, the compromises we must make between what we want and what we need.

Variety Brian Lowry was critical of the show's early episodes, highlighting acting and characterization issues and deeming the adult cast "over-the-top buffoons", with the exception of Mays' Emma, who he felt offered "modest redemption". Though he praised Colfer and Michele's performances, Lowry wrote that the show's talent was squandered by its "jokey, cartoonish, wildly uneven tone", deeming the series a "one-hit wonder". Following the show's mid-season finale, Lowry wrote that while Glee "remains a frustrating mess at times", its "vibrant musical numbers and talented cast have consistently kept it on [his] TiVo must list" conceding that "even with its flaws, TV would be poorer without Glee."

As Glee initial success pulled in a large audience, John Doyle of The Globe and Mail wrote that the early shows "felt fresh, mainly because the motley crew of kids had a kind of square naïveté." Doyle notes that the early success took Glee away from its original characters and plot, focusing more on celebrity guests. "The gaiety is gone from Glee. You should have set it in its prime, mere months ago". Matthew Gilbert of Boston Globe similarly wrote that "It has become a powerful, promotional machine, long on hype and short on the human feeling—the glee—that once made it so addictive".

Music
The show's 754 musical performances, with each performance delivering an individual song or a mashup of two or more songs in a single performance, have led to commercial success, with over thirty-six million copies of Glee cast single releases purchased digitally, and over eleven million albums purchased worldwide through October 2011. In 2009, the Glee cast had twenty-five singles chart on the Billboard Hot 100, the most by any artist since The Beatles had thirty-one songs in the chart in 1964; in 2010, it placed eighty singles on the Billboard Hot 100, far outstripping the previous record. In February 2011, Glee surpassed Elvis Presley as the act with the most songs placed on the Billboard Hot 100 chart, though fewer than one-fourth of them have charted for more than one week. The cast performance of "Don't Stop Believin' was certified gold on October 13, 2009, achieving over 500,000 digital sales, and on March 16, 2011, received platinum certification for having sales of over a million. The series' cover version had a positive effect on sales of Rihanna's "Take a Bow", which increased by 189 percent after the song was covered in the Glee episode "Showmance".

However, there has also been critical condemnation of the cast performances. Jon Dolan of Rolling Stone commented that Matthew Morrison "couldn't rap his way out of a 98° rehearsal", and AllMusic's Andrew Leahey wrote that Cory Monteith and Dianna Agron "can't sing nearly as well as their co-stars". E! Online's Joal Ryan criticized the show for its "overproduced soundtrack" and complained that many songs rely too heavily on the pitch-correcting software Auto-Tune: "For every too-brief moment of Lea Michele sounding raw—and lovely—on a "What a Girl Wants", or Monteith singing a perfectly credible REO Speedwagon in the shower, there's Michele and Monteith sounding like 1990s-era Cher on "No Air", or Monteith sounding like the Monteith XRZ-200 on the out-of-the-shower version of "Can't Fight This Feeling".

During the second season, Rob Sheffield for Rolling Stone noted the Britney Spears and Rocky Horror tribute episodes as examples when he lauded Glee and its choice of music. He praised Murphy for his selection and resurrection of "forgotten" pop songs and compared the show's uniqueness to "MTV in its prime" as the embodiment of popular culture.

Some artists, including Slash, Kings of Leon and Foo Fighters, have declined to have their songs used on the show. Murphy has been publicly critical of these refusals, which has led to exchanges in the press between him and a number of artists. A slated cover of Sir Mix-a-Lot's "Baby Got Back" in the season four episode "Sadie Hawkins" has been criticized for blatantly copying a rendition of the song by Jonathan Coulton without his permission, without giving creative credit. Side-by-Side comparison shows the waveforms appear remarkably similar. Other artists have come forward with allegations of plagiarism in light of this development. It was reported that musician Prince had not given permission for Glee to cover his hit "Kiss" before filming the performance of the cover. Gorillaz founder Damon Albarn said on CBC Radio One that he would not let the show cover any Gorillaz songs: "Firstly, write your own songs. Two, have your own identity and stop being the ... slaves of TV producers ... who don't give a shit about you".

Fandom
Fans of Glee are commonly referred to as "gleeks", a portmanteau of "glee" and "geek". Fox ran a "Biggest GLEEK" competition, measuring fans' Glee-related activity on social networking websites such as Facebook and MySpace, and found that the growth of the fanbase outpaced the network's science-fiction shows. The cast's Hot Topic tour was titled "The Gleek Tour". Glee is one of the most tweeted-about TV shows. In 2011, it was the top trending US TV show. On IMDb, Glee is the seventh highest ranking TV series of the period 2002–2012. Fans have recreated many of its musical numbers in tribute to the show, sharing them on YouTube. Based on this trend, show producers included instrumental versions of some songs on the show's soundtracks.

Similarly, Glee fans have created portmanteaus of character couples, such as "Finchel" for Finn and Rachel, "Samcedes" for Sam and Mercedes, "Klaine" for Kurt and Blaine, and "Brittana" for Brittany and Santana. This fact has been referenced in various second-season episodes, notably "Furt", which is itself a coinage for the new stepbrothers Finn and Kurt, and "Rumours".

Awards and accolades

Glee has received a number of awards and nominations. In 2009, the series won five Satellite Awards: "Best Musical or Comedy TV Series", "Best Actor" and "Actress in a Musical or Comedy TV Series" for Morrison and Michele, "Best Supporting Actress" for Lynch and "Special Achievement for Outstanding Guest Star" for Kristin Chenoweth. In 2010, the show won a Golden Globe Award for "Best Television Series – Musical or Comedy". Morrison, Michele and Lynch also received acting nominations. The series was nominated for two Writers Guild of America Awards, with screenplays nominated in the "Comedy Series" and "New Series" categories. It also won a Peabody Award in 2009. The Glee cast won the "Outstanding Performance by an Ensemble in a Comedy Series" award at the 16th Screen Actors Guild Awards. Paris Barclay and Ryan Murphy both received nominations for "Outstanding Directing – Comedy Series" at the Directors Guild of America Awards for their work on Glee. In July 2010, Glee received nineteen Emmy Award nominations, including "Outstanding Comedy Series", "Outstanding Lead Actor – Comedy Series" for Morrison and "Outstanding Lead Actress – Comedy Series" for Michele; it won four of these, including "Outstanding Supporting Actress in a Comedy Series" for Lynch and "Outstanding Guest Performance by a Male Actor in a Comedy Series" for Neil Patrick Harris. Paris Barclay was also nominated for a Primetime Emmy for Best Directing in a Comedy Series in 2010 for his episode "Wheels".

On January 16, 2011, the show won a Golden Globe for "Best Television Series – Musical or Comedy" and both Lynch and Colfer won Golden Globes for Best Supporting Actress and Best Supporting Actor in a Television Series, Miniseries, or TV Film. In July 2011, Glee received twelve Emmy nominations and won two: Gwyneth Paltrow was named Outstanding Guest Actress in a Comedy Series for her portrayal of Holly Holliday, and the show won the Outstanding Casting for a Comedy Series category. It received three Emmy nominations in July 2012, and four in July 2013. The whole cast was invited to sing at the White House by Michelle Obama in April 2010 for the annual Easter Egg Roll.

Film
Glee: The Concert Movie, a concert film based on the four-week North American segment of the 2011 Glee Live! In Concert! tour and featuring the cast of the series in performance and backstage, was released in the United States and the United Kingdom on August 12, 2011, for a two-week limited engagement. The film is directed by Kevin Tancharoen.

Related media
In January 2010, it was announced that open auditions would be held for three new roles to be introduced in Glee second season. They were open to amateurs and professionals aged sixteen to twenty-six, and were intended to be the subject of a multi-part television special, set to air in the lead-in to the second-season premiere in fall 2010, with the new cast members revealed in the first episode. Murphy commented: "Anybody and everybody now has a chance to be on a show about talented underdogs. We want to be the first interactive musical comedy on television." On June 22, 2010, Josef Adalian of New York magazine revealed that the reality show would not go ahead, due to Murphy's desire to concentrate on the main series, and fear that the distraction of the reality show may damage Glee. Adalian reported that the production team would still choose several winners from the entrants and invite them to appear on Glee for at least one episode. In June 2010, it was announced that Oxygen would host a reality series set to air in June 2011, featuring performers competing for a spot on Glee. The Glee Project started airing on June 12, 2011, and the final episode was broadcast on August 21, 2011. The winning prize was a seven-episode guest-starring role in Glee third season, which was awarded to two contestants, Damian McGinty and Samuel Larsen, with a two-episode role given to the two runner ups, Alex Newell and Lindsay Pearce. The Glee Project was renewed for a second season that ran from June 5 to August 14, 2012, with Blake Jenner as the winner. The show was not renewed for a third season.

On June 7, 2010, UK broadcaster Channel 4 aired Gleeful: The Real Show Choirs of America on its E4 station. The documentary explored the American show choir phenomenon which inspired Glee. Narrated by Nick Grimshaw, it went behind the scenes with real-life glee clubs and detailed celebrity show choir alumni including Lance Bass, Ashton Kutcher, Blake Lively and Anne Hathaway. It was selected as recommended viewing by The Guardian, with the comment: "it's a fascinating look at the real-life New Directions, and it's equally as crackers as its TV champion." The newspaper's Lucy Mangan reviewed the documentary positively, writing: "It will, one way or another, fill your heart to bursting", and commenting that: "Glee, it turns out, is not a gloriously ridiculous, highly polished piece of escapism. It is cinéma vérité." It was watched by 411,000 viewers, a 2.3% audience share.

In summer 2010, Channel 5 in the United Kingdom aired Don't Stop Believing, a reality talent show inspired by Glee success. The series featured live shows in which established and new musical performance groups competed against each other, performing well-known songs in new arrangements, with viewers voting on the winner. Solo singers were also sought to join a group to represent the United Kingdom on the American glee club circuit. Five's controller Richard Woolfe stated: "There's an explosion in musical performance groups and Don't Stop Believing will tap into that exciting groundswell." The show was hosted by Emma Bunton, who told The Belfast Telegraph that she is a "huge fan" of Glee. The show's judges were former EastEnders actress Tamsin Outhwaite, Blue member Duncan James, singer Anastacia and High School Musical choreographer Charles "Chucky" Klapow.

A three-episode documentary miniseries about the deaths of three Glee main cast members – and claiming to investigate the effect of the sudden fame they experienced due to the show on their personal lives – called The Price of Glee, was produced in 2022, with people related to the series finding it in poor taste.

Discography

Albums

Glee: The Music, Volume 1
Glee: The Music, Volume 2
Glee: The Music, Volume 3 Showstoppers
Glee: The Music, The Christmas Album
Glee: The Music, Volume 4

Singles

Songs

See also

References

External links

 
 
 Glee episode list at TV Guide
 "Glee (American television program)" at the Encyclopædia Britannica

 
2009 American television series debuts
2015 American television series endings
2000s American college television series
2000s American comedy-drama television series
2000s American high school television series
2000s American LGBT-related comedy television series
2000s American LGBT-related drama television series
2000s American musical comedy television series
2000s American romantic comedy television series
2000s American teen drama television series
2010s American college television series
2010s American comedy-drama television series
2010s American high school television series
2010s American LGBT-related comedy television series
2010s American LGBT-related drama television series
2010s American musical comedy television series
2010s American romantic comedy television series
2010s American teen drama television series
Best Musical or Comedy Series Golden Globe winners
Cheerleading television series
Dance television shows
Down syndrome in television
English-language television shows
Fox Broadcasting Company original programming
Gay-related television shows
Jukebox musicals
Lesbian-related television shows
Bisexuality-related television series
Outstanding Performance by an Ensemble in a Comedy Series Screen Actors Guild Award winners
Peabody Award-winning television programs
Primetime Emmy Award-winning television series
Same-sex marriage in television
Television series about bullying
Television series about fictional musicians
Television series by 20th Century Fox Television
Television series created by Brad Falchuk
Television series created by Ryan Murphy (writer)
Television shows filmed in Los Angeles
Television shows set in Lima, Ohio
Television shows set in New York City
Transgender-related television shows
Television series about teenagers
Teenage pregnancy in television
Show choirs
Television Academy Honors winners
Coming-of-age television shows